Helen Wills successfully defended her title, defeating Lilí de Álvarez in the final, 6–2, 6–3 to win the ladies' singles tennis title at the 1928 Wimbledon Championships.

Seeds

  Helen Wills (champion)
  Lilí de Álvarez (final) 
  Eileen Bennett (quarterfinals)
  Elizabeth Ryan (semifinals)
  Kea Bouman (third round)
  Phoebe Watson (quarterfinals)
  Cilly Aussem (quarterfinals)
  Helen Jacobs (third round)

Draw

Finals

Top half

Section 1

Section 2

Section 3

Section 4

Bottom half

Section 5

Section 6

Section 7

Section 8

References

External links

Women's Singles
Wimbledon Championship by year – Women's singles
Wimbledon Championships - singles
Wimbledon Championships - singles